Henry Edwards Huntington (February 27, 1850 – May 23, 1927) was an American railroad magnate and collector of art and rare books.  Huntington settled in Los Angeles, where he owned the Pacific Electric Railway as well as substantial real estate interests.  In addition to being a businessman and art collector, Huntington was a major booster for Los Angeles in the late 19th and early 20th centuries. Many places in California are named after him.

History in Southern California
Born in 1850 in Oneonta, New York, to Solon Huntington and his wife, Henry Huntington grew up hearing about his uncle Collis P. Huntington. His uncle became one of The Big Four, instrumental in creating the Central Pacific Railroad (later part of the Southern Pacific), one of the two railroads that built the transcontinental railway in 1869. 

Henry Huntington later worked with his uncle, holding several executive positions under him with the Southern Pacific.  After Collis Huntington's death in 1900, Henry Huntington assumed the senior Huntington's leadership role with Newport News Shipbuilding and Drydock Company in Virginia.  He later married his uncle's widow Arabella Huntington.  

In 1910 Huntington divorced his first wife Mary Alice Prentice Huntington. They had four children together: Howard Edward, Clara Leonora, Elizabeth Vincent, and Marian Prentice. His wife Mary died in 1913. She was the birth sister of Clara Elizabeth Prentice-Huntington, whom his Uncle Collis and his first wife Elizabeth had adopted. 

Huntington's marriage to the widowed Arabella Huntington in 1913 shocked San Francisco society. They were about the same age, so had no children.  

Huntington expected to assume control of the Central and Southern Pacific after his uncle's death. He was blocked by bondholder's representative James Speyer, forcing him to sell his interests to E. H. Harriman.

In 1898, in friendly competition with his uncle's Southern Pacific, Huntington bought the narrow gauge city-oriented Los Angeles Railway (LARy), known as the 'Yellow Car' system. In 1901, Huntington formed the sprawling interurban, standard gauge Pacific Electric Railway (the PE), known as the 'Red Car' system, centered at 6th and Main streets in Los Angeles. Huntington succeeded in this competition by providing passenger-friendly streetcars on 24/7 schedules, which the railroads could not match. This was in the period of a boom in Southern California land development. Housing was built in places such as Orange County's Huntington Beach, a Huntington-sponsored development, and streetcars served passenger needs that the railroads had not considered. Connectivity to Downtown Los Angeles made such suburbs feasible.

At its greatest extent, the system contained over 20 streetcar lines and 1,250 trolleys, most running through the core of Los Angeles and serving such nearby neighborhoods as the Crenshaw district, West Adams, Echo Park, Westlake, Hancock Park, Exposition Park,  Vernon, Boyle Heights and Lincoln Heights. The system integrated the 1902 acquisition, the Mount Lowe Scenic Railway above Altadena, California in the San Gabriel Mountains.

In 1905 Huntington, A. Kingsley Macomber, and William R. Staats developed the Oak Knoll subdivision, located to the west of his San Marino estate in the oak-covered hilly terrain near Pasadena.

In 1906, Huntington, along with Frank Miller, owner of the Mission Inn, and Charles M. Loring, formed the Huntington Park Association, with the intent to purchase Mount Rubidoux in Riverside, build a road to the summit, and develop the hill as a park to benefit the city of Riverside.  The road was completed in February 1907. The property was later donated to the city of Riverside by the heirs of Frank Miller, and today the hill is a  city park.

Huntington was a Life Member of the Sons of the Revolution in the State of California.

Huntington retired from business in 1916. In 1927 Henry E. Huntington died in Philadelphia while undergoing surgery. He and Arabella are buried, with a large monument, in the Gardens of the Huntington Library in San Marino, California.

Hotel

The Huntington Hotel was originally named Hotel Wentworth when it opened on February 1, 1907. Financial problems and a disappointing first season forced it to close indefinitely. Henry Huntington purchased the Wentworth in 1911, renaming it the Huntington Hotel. It reopened in 1914, transformed into a winter resort. The 1920s were prosperous for the hotel, as Midwestern and Eastern entrepreneurs discovered California's warm winter climate.

The hotel's reputation for fine service began with long-time general manager and later owner Stephen W. Royce. By 1926, the hotel's success prompted Royce to open the property year-round. The "golden years" ended with the stock market crash and the Great Depression of the late 1920s and early 1930s. By the end of the 1930s the hotel was vibrant again. When World War II began, all reservations were cancelled and the hotel was rented to the Army for $3,000 a month. Following the war, the Huntington's fortunes improved again. In 1954 Stephen Royce sold the hotel to the Sheraton Corporation, serving as general manager until his retirement in 1969. The hotel operated until 1985, when it closed because of its inability to meet seismic standards. The structure was built of reinforced concrete in 1906.

After a -year major renovation, the hotel reopened in March 1991 as the Ritz Carlton Huntington Hotel and Spa. The hotel completed a $19 million renovation in January 2006; it changed hands in early 2007 and became Langham Brand International, Huntington Hotel & SPA.

Legacy

Huntington left a prominent legacy with the Huntington Library, Art Museum and Botanical Gardens on his former estate in San Marino near Pasadena. Other legacies in California include the cities of Huntington Beach and Huntington Park, as well as Huntington Lake.

Also in greater Los Angeles are the Huntington Hospital in Pasadena, Henry E. Huntington Middle School in San Marino, and the grand boulevard, Huntington Drive, running eastbound from downtown Los Angeles. Its landscaped central parkway was previously the right-of-way for the Northern Division of the Pacific Electric.

Riverside's city park on Mount Rubidoux was originally named Huntington Park, and the road to the top was named Huntington Drive. After Frank Miller's heirs donated the property to the city, the city renamed the park the Frank A. Miller Rubidoux Memorial Park, and the road has become known as Mount Rubidoux Drive.  A plaque that was dedicated to Huntington in 1907, in recognition of his contributions to the development of Mount Rubidoux, remains on a large boulder known as Huntington Rock.  After Huntington's death a second tablet was placed on the north side of the hill at a place named the Huntington Shrine.

His legacy on the East Coast includes the Huntington Memorial Library in Oneonta, New York, opened July 9, 1920 in his childhood home.

As well as a portrait by Oswald Birley at the Huntington Library, portraits of Huntington were also painted by the Swiss-born American artist Adolfo Müller-Ury who built a studio less than a mile from Huntington's estate in San Marino in 1924-1925: a full-length, based on a photograph, is at the Collis Potter & Howard Edwards Huntington Memorial Hospital in Pasadena, and two seated versions, a small one of which was acquired by Huntington's son-in-law John Metcalf, and a larger one (which is presumed lost) which was engraved by an artist called Witherspoon in 1928. The artist also painted Huntington's granddaughter Mary Brockway Metcalf (this is on long-term loan to the offices of the Director of the Huntington Library and Art Gallery).

See also
Huntington family
1919 Streetcar Strike of Los Angeles
Pacific Electric Railway strike of 1903

Footnotes

References
 Breithaupt, Jr., Richard Hoag, 1994, Sons of the Revolution in the State of California.  Centennial Register 1893-1993, Walika Publishing Company, 
 
 Dickinson, Donald C., 1995, Henry E. Huntington's Library of Libraries, Huntington Library Press, 
 
 Gale, Zona. Frank Miller of the Mission Inn, New York, D. Appleton-Century Company, 1938.
 Hutchings, DeWitt V.  The Story of Mount Rubidoux, Riverside, California.
 Thorpe, James, 1994, Henry Edwards Huntington, A Biography, University of California Press, 
 Wenzel, Glenn. Anecdotes on Mount Rubidoux and Frank A. Miller, Her Promoter, Glenn E. Wenzel, 2010.

External links

 
Find A Grave, Henry Edwards Huntington
Find A Grave, Arabelle Huntington

American art collectors
American book and manuscript collectors
Philanthropists from New York (state)
20th-century American railroad executives
American railway entrepreneurs
Bibliophiles
Museum founders
People from Oneonta, New York
People from the San Gabriel Valley
Philanthropists from California
History of Riverside, California
People from San Marino, California
1850 births
1927 deaths
Pacific Electric Railway
People associated with the Huntington Library
Huntington family